Homalinotus colossus is a species of weevil belonging to the family Curculionidae. This species can be found in Brazil.

References 

 Catalogue of Life
 Wtaxa
 Global Species

Molytinae
Beetles described in 1844